Spike is the name of several fictional characters appearing in American comic books published by Marvel Comics. They are not to be confused with Spyke from X-Men: Evolution, nor with Spike Freeman, another character in the groups X-Statix and X-Force.

Spike (Darian Elliott) is a character in the series X-Statix from Marvel Comics.

Spike (Gary Walsh) is a character from New X-Men, who first appeared in issue #126 of that title. He was a student at the Xavier Institute before M-Day.

Lance Gibson portrayed the role in X-Men: The Last Stand.

Spike (X-Statix)

Publication history
The Spike (Darian Elliott) first appeared in X-Force #121, and was created by Peter Milligan and Mike Allred. He is a mutant that could generate razor-sharp spikes from his body, which he could fire outward with deadly accuracy.

Fictional character biography
After watching video footage of independent hero the Spike in action, the Santa Monica, California-based mutant-superhero group X-Statix agrees to have him join the team. His antagonistic nature creates fighting and tension among himself and his teammates.

During a battle with the mutant terrorist group the Brotherhood, the Spike aids the Orphan in killing one of the Brotherhood members by impaling her as she fell backwards from the Orphan's punch. In another battle, in Central America, the Spike and the Anarchist competed to kill as many militiamen as possible. Sometime later, after seeing Vivisector and Phat holding hands, the Spike's homophobic reaction causes another rift with the team. The Spike eventually is killed by an impostor, who is himself then killed.

Spike (New X-Men)

Publication history
Spike (Gary Walsh) first appeared in New X-Men vol. 1 #126 (but did not receive a real name until eight issues later), he was created by Grant Morrison and Frank Quitely. He was listed as depowered during the M-Day event.

Fictional character biography
Spike is a young mutant enrolled at the Xavier Institute for Higher Learning. Spike has the ability to extend sharp, pointed protrusions from his body.

Other comic characters named Spike
A member of The People was known as Spike.  The youth had six arms but apparently perished in the destruction of her mansion.  She first appeared (and perished) in Sub-Mariner vol. 1, #42
Spike is also the name of a Deviant mutant, who along with Coal and String, was sent by Ghaur to retrieve the Proteus Horn which could summon undersea monsters.  He was mistaken for Sunspot by Namorita.  He first appeared in New Mutants Annual #5
A member of Hellbent was also called Spike.  He could fire spikes that caused delusions.  He first appeared in Moon Knight vol. 3, #58.
An agent of Rainman is known as Spike as well.  He was forced to give information about the Rainman by the White Tiger and first appeared in Crew #2.

Other versions
 Earth-616: David Munroe was born in New Jersey to an unknown father and Vivian Munroe (Storm's father's sister). Vivian named her son David, after Ororo's father, who had died too soon. Unfortunately, she later became a drug addict and eventually died of HIV, leaving young David in the care of his loving grandparents. As of yet David hasn't manifested any mutant powers. He also has yet to join the X-Men and has only recently met Storm in this universe.
 A version of Spike appeared in the X-Babies Stars Reborn as an evil, indestructible X-Baby.

In other media

Television

A variation of Spike named Evan Daniels / Spyke appears in X-Men: Evolution, voiced by Neil Denis. This version is the teenage son of an unnamed father and Vivian Daniels and nephew of Storm. While attending high school as part of the basketball team, Evan's powers begin to develop. Storm, Cyclops, and Jean Grey approach Evan's parents about him attending the Xavier Institute, but he refuses. After being framed as a thief by his former teammate Pietro Maximoff and being bailed out of prison by Charles Xavier, Evan takes the name "Spyke", joins the X-Men to defeat Pietro and clear his name. Throughout the series, Evan struggles with receiving unwanted special treatment due to being Storm's nephew and behaving selfishly, which culminates in him unknowingly drinking an energy drink that is toxic to mutants, losing control of his powers, and joining the Morlocks as a result. Over time, he would mutate into an armadillo-like form and gain the ability to heat his spikes while working with the Morlocks to fight humans committing hate crimes against them and other mutants, though he would join forces with the X-Men to defeat Apocalypse in the series finale.

Film
 A character inspired by Spike makes a non-speaking cameo appearance in X-Men: The Last Stand, portrayed by Lance Gibson. This version is a member of the Omegas, who join forces with Magneto's Brotherhood to oppose the creation of a "mutant cure".
 A character inspired by Spike simply named Daniels appears in X-Men: Days of Future Past, portrayed by Jaa Smith-Johnson. This version is an American G.I. who fought in the Vietnam War as part of a mutant military team.

References

Characters created by Mike Allred
Characters created by Peter Milligan
Comics characters introduced in 2001
Fictional blade and dart throwers
Fictional African-American people
Marvel Comics mutants
Marvel Comics superheroes